"Vstříc nekonečnům" is a song from the Katarze album of Czech pop music group Slza. The music was created by Dalibor Cidlinský Jr. with Lukáš Bundil and the text composed by Xindl X.

Music video 
The music video was shot by Jakub and Mikuláš Křenov aka KrenBros. The video clip lasts 4:02 and includes footage from the recording studio, the football field in Frýdštejn, where producer Dalibor Cidlinský Jr. studio and Katarze Tour tour, which had 13 concerts around the Czech Republic and for the first time between April 3 and 30, 2016.

References 

2015 songs
2016 singles
Slza songs
Universal Music Group singles
Songs written by Xindl X